Hong Kong has three main systems of units of measurement in current use:

 The Chinese units of measurement of the Qing Empire (no longer in widespread use in mainland China);
 British Imperial units; and
 The metric system.

In 1976 the Hong Kong Government started the conversion to the metric system, and as of 2012 measurements for government purposes, such as road signs, are almost always in metric units. However, all three systems are officially permitted for trade, and in the wider society a mixture of all three systems prevails.

Length
The metric system is used for all official purposes in Hong Kong, however, the imperial system is sometimes used in informal situations.

The legal units for trade include ,  and  only, but they are no longer in daily use, with the words  and  commonly understood as the imperial measure foot and inch which are pronounced the same.

The Imperial system's units are written with the same basic Chinese characters as the Chinese system. In order to distinguish between the units of the two systems, the units can be prefixed with ying for the British Imperial system and wa for the Chinese system. In writing, derived characters are often used, with an additional  radical to the left of the original Chinese character, for writing Imperial units. The most commonly used units are the mile or li, the yard or ma, the foot or chek, and the inch or tsun.

Rulers and tapes on the market normally have dual markings in centimetres and feet and inches, which are both commonly used for body measurements.

Transport 
All modern roads and railways are measured, built and signposted in the metric system.

All the imperial speed limit signs were replaced within 3 days in 25 August 1984 to 27 August 1984 upon enactment of new traffic law, with a temporary territory-wide speed limit of 50 km/h in force within that 3 days, while all remaining road signs were gradually replaced within the following 3 years.

Starting in 2001, speed limit signs showing the word km/h were gradually replaced with signs showing number only, to improve readability as drivers had already accustomed to the metric system. As a result, speed limit signs in Hong Kong now look identical to those in the UK, but with different meanings.

However, some old signs showing dual measures still exists, for example, the height restriction at the entrance of old buildings.

The old trunk roads built in the early 20th century connecting Kowloon and New Territories, including Castle Peak Road, Tai Po Road, Clear Water Bay Road, were traditionally measured in miles from Tsim Sha Tsui Star Ferry. Stone mileposts were erected along the way but they are gradually lost to time. Although this system is no longer in official use today, they are still commonly used for describing locations on the Castle Peak Road, with the Chinese character 咪, being a phonetic transcription of "mile", used instead of 哩 or 英里, and sometimes form the official address of establishments en-route (for example, the address of Kadoorie Beach is 18¾ milestone, Castle Peak Road). The shopping mall of CDW Building was renamed 8½  after refurbishment in 2016 based on the old milestones.

When the KCR British Section was modernised and electrified in 1982, milestones were erected every approximately 500 m showing the distance from Hung Hom station in kilometres, and similarly the labels on the overhead wire masts are in kilometres as well. The signalling and signs are identical to those used in Great Britain at that time, with the speed limit signs in yellow numbers, but in km/h instead of mph used in Great Britain. All the chainage on the railways are in kilometres and metres as well.

Flight levels within Hong Kong FIR are in feet like most Western countries, in contrast to mainland China where metres are used, while on land elevations on maps are in metres.

Sports facilities 
All public running tracks and swimming pools are built in metric, with running tracks having international-standard 400 m laps, and most swimming pools in international-standard 50 m length, and the smaller pools 25 m length.

The two racecourses, Happy Valley Racecourse and Sha Tin Racecourse, are marked in metres and races run in metres.

Topological maps published by the government uses the Military Grid Reference System, with squares being 1 km x 1 km in size.

Weight

Chinese, Imperial and metric weight units are all used in Hong Kong. The choice of system depends on the type of goods and their origins. Metric is used for all official purposes, for example the Post Office and Road signs. Packaged food weights and volumes may be given using any of the three systems of units.

Public scales in wet markets are in all three units. These are provided to deter dishonesty by wet market merchants.

Traditional weights are still de facto standard in certain areas. For example, vegetables, meats, and Chinese medicines are usually measured in Chinese units, while some fruits are normally measured using the Imperial system.

Precious metals (gold, silver and platinum) are traded in the Chinese troy weight system, which differs from other goods.

Bathroom scales on the market are normally dual-scaled with kg and lb, while electronic ones can be switched between kg and lb. Like in the US, if imperial units are used, only lb is used in reporting body weight while stones are not used.

Area

The traditional measure of real estate area is in square feet of the Imperial system. Apartment or office size is generally still given in square feet. However, square metres are used for official purposes.

The traditional units of agricultural land area are the mau (a unit used throughout China) and the local dau chung. Notionally the two units are defined differently, with the dau chung being the amount of land which could be planted by one dau of rice; in practice that area of land is roughly equal to one mau, though the exact area of a dau chung traditionally could vary based on soil quality.

Volume
The volume of water and fuel is the litre. The gallon (ga-lun) of the Imperial system is still occasionally used.

Time
Time measurement follows the international system. Gregorian calendar is usually used, but the Chinese calendar also plays a very important role in everyday life and in telling the dates of traditional festivals.

In the following table, multiple Chinese names are listed in the order of usage frequency.

Energy
The kilojoule or kilocalorie is the unit used for the measurement of energy in food. The British thermal unit (BTU) is still used to measure the output of air conditioners.

Power
Horsepower is still the dominant measurement for the power of cars . The Chinese counting word  (pat) is the measure word in Chinese, carried over from the measure word of horses.

See also
Units, Systems, & History of measurement
Chinese & Taiwanese units of measurement
Japanese, Korean, & Vietnamese units of measurement
English, Imperial, & US units of measurement

References 

Customary units of measurement
Chinese units in Hong Kong
Systems of units
Units of measurement by country